EGEE may refer to:

 European Grid Infrastructure
 2-Ethoxyethanol